Neoregelia farinosa is a species of flowering plant in the genus Neoregelia. This species is endemic to Brazil.

Cultivars
 Neoregelia 'Angela Espinosa'
 Neoregelia 'Electric Red'
 Neoregelia 'ExEx Three'
 Neoregelia 'Far Superior'
 Neoregelia 'Far-Fost'
 Neoregelia 'Fire Bird'
 Neoregelia 'Fost-Far'
 Neoregelia 'George'
 Neoregelia 'Green Rosette'
 Neoregelia 'Lavender Mist'
 Neoregelia 'Lemon Blush'
 Neoregelia 'Lolita'
 Neoregelia 'Margaret'
 Neoregelia 'Morrisoniana'
 Neoregelia 'Painted Lady'
 Neoregelia 'Red Devil'
 Neoregelia 'Rojizo'
 Neoregelia 'Rose Apple'
 Neoregelia 'Rosea Striata'
 Neoregelia 'Russell Lively'
 Neoregelia 'Sharon's Delight'
 Neoregelia 'Spotted Fire Bird'
 Neoregelia 'Ti Di'
 × Neomea 'Flame'

References

BSI Cultivar Registry Retrieved 11 October 2009

farinosa
Flora of Brazil